Ludwig Wittgenstein (Ludwig Josef Johann Wittgenstein, 1889 – 1951) was an Austrian-British philosopher.

Wittgenstein may also refer to:
 Wittgenstein (film), Derek Jarman's 1993 biopic of Ludwig Wittgenstein
 Wittgenstein family relatives of Ludwig
  in Vienna, Austria, now demolished residence of the family
 Haus Wittgenstein, residence of Margaret Stonborough-Wittgenstein in Vienna, Austria, partly designed by her brother Ludwig
 Wittgenstein Castle, near Bad Laasphe, Germany, seat of the principality of Wittgenstein 
 Sayn-Wittgenstein, a German noble family, formerly counts of Wittgenstein
 Wittgenstein, a fictional computer in The Brave Little Toaster to the Rescue and The Brave Little Toaster Goes to Mars

People with the surname

Viennese Wittgensteins
 Karl Wittgenstein (1847–1913), Austrian steel tycoon and father of Ludwig
 Margaret Stonborough-Wittgenstein (Margarethe Anna Maria, 1882–1958 ), sister of Ludwig
 Paul Wittgenstein  (1887–1961), pianist and brother of Ludwig
 Paul Wittgenstein (grandson of his namesake, 1907–1979), eccentric and subject of Thomas Bernard's book Wittgenstein's Nephew (1982)

Sayn-Wittgensteins
  (died 1272), abbott of Grafschaft Abbey
 Louis I, Count of Sayn-Wittgenstein (1532–1605), German nobleman
 Prince Peter Wittgenstein (1769–1843), Russian field marshal
 Wilhelm Ludwig Sayn-Wittgenstein, Prussian politician
 Ludwig zu Sayn-Wittgenstein-Berleburg (1799–1866), Russian aristocrat
 Princess Carolyne zu Sayn-Wittgenstein (1819–1887), Russian noblewoman, Franz Liszt's mistress and patron
 Heinrich Prinz zu Sayn-Wittgenstein (1916–1944), World War II German flying ace
 Botho Prinz zu Sayn-Wittgenstein-Hohenstein (1927–2008), German politician
 Richard, 6th Prince of Sayn-Wittgenstein-Berleburg (1934–2017), German businessman
 Princess Nathalie of Sayn-Wittgenstein-Berleburg (born 1975), Danish equestrian
 August Wittgenstein (August-Frederik Prinz zu Sayn-Wittgenstein-Berleburg, born 1981), German-Swedish actor